Wrzelowiec Landscape Park (Wrzelowiecki Park Krajobrazowy) is a protected area (Landscape Park) in eastern Poland, established in 1990, covering an area of .

The Park lies within Lublin Voivodeship and takes its name from the village of Wrzelowiec.

References 

Wrzelowiec
Parks in Lublin Voivodeship